Lualua can refer to

People
Lomana LuaLua, a Zaire-born Congo DR international footballer who plays for Cypriot club Merit Alsancak Yeşilova
Kazenga LuaLua, younger brother of Lomana, plays for Luton Town

Other
Lualua (ship), also known as fou-lualua or foulua, a Samoan voyaging catamaran